John Bridgeman may refer to:

Politicians
John Bridgeman (died 1523), MP for Exeter
John Bridgeman (died 1729) (c. 1655–1729), of Prinknash, Member of Parliament for Gloucester
John Bridgeman (American politician), member of the North Carolina House of Representatives

Others
John Bridgeman (judge) (1568/9–1638), of Prinknash, Chief Justice of Chester
John Bridgeman (bishop) (1577–1652), English bishop of Chester
Sir John Bridgeman, 2nd Baronet (1631–1710), of the Bridgeman baronets
Sir John Bridgeman, 3rd Baronet (1667–1747), of the Bridgeman baronets
John Bridgeman (sculptor) (1916–2004), British sculptor